{{DISPLAYTITLE:Upsilon1 Centauri}}

Upsilon1 Centauri, Latinized from υ1 Centauri, is a single star in the southern constellation of Centaurus. It has a blue-white hue and is visible to the naked eye with an apparent visual magnitude of +3.87. The distance to this object is approximately 427 light years based on parallax, and is receding with a radial velocity of +9 km/s. It is a member of the Lower Centaurus Crux group of the Scorpius–Centaurus association.

The stellar classification of this object is B2 IV/V, matching a massive B-type star with a luminosity class displaying mixed traits of a main sequence and a subgiant star. It is 13 million years old and is spinning with a projected rotational velocity of 124 km/s. The star has 7.9 times the mass of the Sun and 3.7 times the Sun's radius. It is radiating 1,884 times the luminosity of the Sun from its photosphere at an effective temperature of 21,411 K.

References

B-type main-sequence stars
B-type subgiants
Lower Centaurus Crux

Centaurus (constellation)
Centauri, Upsilon1
Durchmusterung objects
121790
068282
5249